Quinsey may refer to:

People with the surname
Vernon Quinsey (born 1944), Canadian psychologist
Mark Quinsey (1985–2009), victim in the 2009 Massereene Barracks shooting
Michael Quinsey, Canadian actor on Katts and Dog. Head Wrestling Coach for University of Toronto Varsity Blues, (2003–2017)

Other
Quinsey, a name for peritonsillar abscess

See also
Quinzhee, a shelter made into snow
Quinzy (band), Canadian musical group
Quinsy (disambiguation)
Quincy (disambiguation)
Quincey (disambiguation)